The 1914–15 season was Cardiff City F.C.'s 18th season of competitive football and the team's fifth in the Southern Football League. They competed in the 20-team Southern Football League First Division, then the third tier of English football, finishing 3rd.

Season review

Southern Football League Division One

Partial league table

Results by round

Players
First team squad.

Fixtures and results

Southern League Division One

FA Cup

References

Bibliography

Cardiff City F.C. seasons
Association football clubs 1914–15 season
Card